Nox Arcana is the American neoclassical dark wave, dark ambient musical project of Joseph Vargo. It was founded in 2003 as a duo with William Piotrowski, who left in 2008 to pursue a career in film score composing but still acts as its studio engineer whereas Vargo continued on as a solo act under the name. According to the Nox Arcana biography, the name in Latin translates to "mysteries of the night," but actually translates to "mysterious night;" "mysteries of the night" would translate to arcāna noctis.

All of Nox Arcana's music is released independently on the Monolith Graphics label, a publishing company owned by Vargo. With their third album, Nox Arcana became a Billboard Top Ten charting artist in the holiday genre.

Concept
Nox Arcana specializes in concept albums based on original stories, as well as gothic fiction and classic horror literature Some of their albums also make reference to medieval themes and ancient mythology.

In addition to the storytelling aspect of each album, hidden puzzles and interactive quests are incorporated into the album artwork and into the music itself. Beginning with the Blood of the Dragon CD in 2006, Vargo began a tradition of incorporating a quest or adventure within the album artwork and sometimes leaving clues in his narratives. He later went back and did the same for some of the earlier CDs. Now more than half of Nox Arcana's CDs contain some sort of hidden puzzle, which is left to the listener to discover.

Nox Arcana's music is often used to provide atmosphere for films, public events, role-playing games and during Halloween at theme parks, several of which have based haunted attractions on Nox Arcana's original theme albums, Transylvania and Blackthorn Asylum.

Musical style
Nox Arcana's music is melodic and moody, focusing on a dominant melody line. Instrumentation varies with each album as appropriate to the theme or time period of the album concept, and typically includes piano, bells, violin, pipe organ, harpsichord, timpani drums and other percussion. Some albums also include cymbals, lutes, acoustic guitars, bagpipes and glockenspiel, depending on the theme of a given album.

Their music is generally classified as dark neoclassical or dark ambient, "sometimes sandwiched into the gothic music genre"  and aptly labeled "atmospheric gothic." The moods associated with Nox Arcana music describe it as ominous, romantic, lush, epic, otherworldly, menacing, spooky and eerie, Nox Arcana's music covers a broad range of subgenres within the rock and alternative music categories.

Joseph Vargo explained Nox Arcana's style to a blogger from Gnostics.com: "Our music is mainly classically based instrumental, although we do incorporate chanting choirs and spoken narratives for dramatic effect to achieve a blend of darkly haunting melodies that encompass the complete gothic spectrum the romantic, the mysterious, and the horrific. We utilize a variety of instruments such as piano, pipe organ, violin, acoustic guitar, drums and tolling bells to achieve symphonic orchestrations. Our concept has always been to create moody and melody-driven gothic soundscapes that take the listener on a musical journey through various dark realms of fantasy."

Carnival of Lost Souls though primarily a dark cabaret-style album, also contains a heavy metal song, while the music on the Blood of Angels album blends industrial dance and tribal rhythms with ethereal-style vocals.

Vocals and narratives are also used sparingly to help relate a story or serve as introduction to a musical piece, for example, the voice of "Jonathan Harker" and whispered female voices of "Dracula's brides" that beckon to the listener, a carnival barker with the indistinct sounds of an audience in the distance, or "Edgar Allan Poe" and a voice calling out from the grave after being prematurely buried, the gravelly voice of a "witch" casting a spell, and a variety of low Gregorian-style chanting and choirs. Enforcing the theme and the narrative are the use of sound effects, such as a door creaking or a pendulum swinging on the Poe-inspired Shadow of the Raven.

Their trilogy of winter holiday-themed albums feature a range of ethereal-style choirs, Gregorian-style chanting, classical music, and Celtic new-age instrumentation, giving a darker overtone to music for the Christmas and Yuletide holidays. Their third release, Winter's Knight peaked at #8 on the Billboard chart for Top Holiday Album in 2006 and again in 2007. In 2022, Nox Arcana's Halloween-themed EP, Darkfall, debuted at #13 on Billboard's Classical Crossover chart.

Three albums, Blood of Angels, Zombie Influx, and House of Nightmares were recorded as side-projects with other artists or vocalists. William Piotrowski released his first solo film soundtrack with Crimson Winter. Joseph Vargo wrote and recorded solo for later albums, Blackthorn Asylum, Winter's Eve, Theater of Illusion, The Dark Tower, Winter's Majesty, Legion of Shadows, Gothic, Season of the Witch, and Ebonshire, which has become a series of holiday music EPs released each year, culminating in 2018 with the full collection.

Influences

Nox Arcana is influenced by new-age, classical, ambient music, rock music, and film soundtracks, citing other composers such as John Carpenter, Danny Elfman, AC/DC, Wojciech Kilar, Enya, Loreena McKennitt, Beethoven, Jerry Goldsmith, and Hans Zimmer. Their literary references include H. P. Lovecraft, Bram Stoker, The Brothers Grimm, Ray Bradbury, and Edgar Allan Poe.

Joseph Vargo's cover art for Nox Arcana's Transylvania album was featured as a full page in LIFE magazine's October 2021 issue, Vampires: Their Undying Appeal.

Discography

Stage and screen
Nox Arcana support a wide variety of independent productions like radio dramas and student films to which they lend their music. A number of professional performances of gothic plays, such as Frankenstein, The Legend of Sleepy Hollow, Alice's Adventures in Wonderland, Dracula and Richard III have featured music by Nox Arcana.

In 2013, a young Corsican filmmaker Ariakina Ettori won first place in the L'Institut Régional du Cinéma et de l'Audiovisuel (IRCA) with her modern version of "Little Red Riding Hood" inspired by Nox Arcana's song "Night of the Wolf." The film school credits Joseph Vargo and Nox Arcana for their unconditional support.

William Piotrowski wrote the score for a local production entitled Ghosts of Ohio, a video documentary about Mary Ann Winkowski, a real-life medium who inspired the CBS television show Ghost Whisperer. In 2013, William wrote and performed the motion picture soundtrack for the vampire film Crimson Winter.

Nox Arcana's music is used by theme parks such as Busch Gardens, Six Flags, Knott's Scary Farm, Kennywood Park and Universal Studios during Halloween for scenes and haunted houses based upon their album themes. Nox Arcana's music is featured exclusively on the TV show America Haunts for the Travel Channel, which has aired throughout the Halloween weekend each year since 2009. Music from Nox Arcana's Transylvania album was featured on the FOX TV show So You Think You Can Dance.

In 2016, Nox Arcana's musical composition "Night of the Wolf" from their Transylvania album is the centerpiece of a live performance for Cirque des Voix, a show that combines orchestral and choral music with contemporary circus acts.

Work with other music acts
Nox Arcana's sound has been used by other performing artists to introduce their albums or live shows. Joseph Vargo recorded the vocal Intro for the 2008 album Witchtanic Hellucinations by Acid Witch. He also provided the intro music and vocals for Legion of the Damned albums Cult of the Dead (2008) and Decent Into Chaos (2011). LOTD also opened their 2010 "Slaughtering" tour with Nox Arcana's song "Circus Diabolique" from their album Carnival of Lost Souls. In 2013, Blood on the Dance Floor opened their Bad Blood tour with "Essence of Evil" from Nox Arcana's Blackthorn Asylum album.

Monolith Graphics
Monolith Graphics publishes and distributes Nox Arcana music worldwide. The publishing company is owned by Joseph Vargo, who became world-renowned as a gothic-fantasy artist in the early 1990s with work ranging from album covers and books to posters and other products. Before forming Nox Arcana in 2003, Joseph Vargo produced two albums for Midnight Syndicate but left the band in 2000 to co-write Tales from the Dark Tower, a book that follows the exploits of a vampire during the First Crusade. Over the next 8 years, he published Dark Realms magazine, released a best-selling card deck, The Gothic Tarot, and wrote a book based on his original story for Nox Arcana's debut album, Darklore Manor. In 2011, Vargo released, Beyond the Dark Tower, a sequel to Tales from the Dark Tower along with The Dark Tower album based on his book series.

References

External links
Official website
Publisher/Label
 MySpace profile
 [ All Music profile]
 Nox Arcana at Discogs

Interviews
Archived interviews with Nox Arcana
Halloween Database, August 2007
Parallel Perspectives, May 2007
Music Street Journal, September 2006

American dark wave musical groups
American gothic rock groups
Rock music groups from Ohio
Dark ambient music groups
Musical groups established in 2003
Musical groups from Cleveland
Neoclassical dark wave musical groups